Vital Eiselt (born 6 May 1941) is a Slovenian former basketball player. He represented the Yugoslavia national basketball team internationally. Eiselt was a member of the Yugoslavia national team that competed in the men's tournament at the 1964 Summer Olympics.

References

External links
 

1941 births
Living people
Basketball players at the 1964 Summer Olympics
KK Olimpija players
Olympic basketball players of Yugoslavia
Slovenian men's basketball players
Basketball players from Ljubljana
Yugoslav men's basketball players
1963 FIBA World Championship players